The National Federation of Women's Music Clubs was founded by Florence Sutro (1865 – 1906), who was herself a musician and painter.  She was its first president.

References

Music organizations
Organizations with year of establishment missing
Women's clubs in the United States
Women's music